Fabienne Serrat (born 5 July 1956) is a former world champion alpine ski racer.
At age 17, Serrat won two gold medals at the 1974 World Championships in St. Moritz, Switzerland, in the giant slalom and the combined events. During her World Cup career she had three victories, 37 podiums, and 124 top ten finishes.

Career
Serrat competed at the 1976, 1980 and 1984 Winter Olympics in a total of five events. Her best result was fourth place in the giant slalom in 1980. She retired from competition in 1984 at age 27 and married Swiss ski racer Peter Lüscher, the 1979 World Cup overall champion.

Europa Cup results
Serrat has won an overall Europa Cup and one specialty standings.

FIS Alpine Ski Europa Cup
Overall: 1972
Slalom: 1972

References

External links 
 
 Fabienne Serrat World Cup standings at the International Ski Federation
 
 

1956 births
Living people
French female alpine skiers
Olympic alpine skiers of France
Alpine skiers at the 1976 Winter Olympics
Alpine skiers at the 1980 Winter Olympics
Alpine skiers at the 1984 Winter Olympics